Born to Love may refer to:

 Born to Love (film), a 1931 film with Constance Bennett
 Born to Love (Mayday album), 2007
 Born to Love (Peabo Bryson and Roberta Flack album), 1983
 "Born to Love" (Meduza song), 2020
 "Born to Love", a 1985 song by Claudja Barry
 "Born to Love", a 1988 song by Den Harrow
 "Born to Love", a 1971 song by SRC
"Born to Love", a 1937 song by Billie Holiday
 "Born to Love", a song by Nazareth on the 1977 album Play 'n' the Game
 "Born to Love", a song by Alyssa Milano on the 1989 album Look in My Heart
 "Born to Love", a song by Randy Stonehill on the 1990 album Until We Have Wings